Randle Highlands is a neighborhood in Southeast Washington, D.C., east of the Anacostia River.

History 
Born in 1859, Colonel Arthur E. Randle was a late nineteenth and early twentieth-century real estate developer, who earned some recognition for building Congress Heights, before developing Hillcrest and other neighborhoods, east of the Anacostia River. Moving his family into a large, Greek Revival house - later nicknamed 'The Southeast White House' - in what is, now, the Randle Highlands neighborhood, Randle encouraged more Washingtonians to follow and build grand homes, along Pennsylvania Avenue.

Transportation 
The nearest Metrorail station to Randle Highlands is the Potomac Avenue Station, which is located on Pennsylvania Avenue about 1.5 miles west of Randle Highlands. Although the neighborhood is not directly served by a rail station, it is served by several Washington Metropolitan Area Transit Authority (WMATA) Metrobus lines, all of which stop at the Potomac Avenue Station.

Education

Elementary school 

Randle Highlands Elementary School (1650 30th Street, S.E.) is the only school located within the Randle Highlands neighborhood. Most elementary age students living in Randle Highlands live in the Randle Highlands Elementary School district, however, some elementary students in Randle Highlands live in the Lawrence E. Boone Elementary School (2200 Minnesota Avenue, S.E.) district. The original school was built in 1911, then replaced by a newer building in 2002.

Middle school 

Most middle school aged students in Randle Highlands live in the Sousa Middle School (3650 Ely Place, S.E.) district, however, some middle school students in Randle Highlands live in the Kramer Middle School (1700 Q Street, S.E.) district.

High school 

All of Randle Highlands is in the Anacostia High School (1601 16th Street, S.E.) school district.

Government & politics

Federal 

Randle Highlands is located entirely within the borders of the District of Columbia, which means they do not have voting representation in Congress. However, the residents of the District of Columbia elect a non-voting delegate to congress as well as two Shadow Senators and a Shadow Representative who promote the interests of residents.

Current representation at the federal level

District 
Randle Highlands is located primarily in Ward 7, although a small section of the westernmost portion of the neighborhood is located in Ward 8.

Current representation at the district level

Local 
In addition to the eight wards, the District of Columbia is further divided into  Advisory Neighborhood Commission's or ANC's which are a non-partisan, neighborhood body made up of locally elected commissioners elected to two year terms from their ANC's single member district (SMD). While Randle Highland is primary in SMD 7B02, there is a small section of the neighborhood in SMD 7B03 as well as a small section in SMD 8A01.

Current representation at the local level

Civic association 
Randle Highlands has an active civic association which meets during the months of March through November on the 4th Thursday of each month at the D.C. Dream Center (2826 Q Street, S.E.), however due do the ongoing COVID-19 pandemic the association has paused their meetings until further notice.

Boundaries 
Randle Highlands is bounded by Pennsylvania Avenue SE to the north; Naylor Road, 27th Street, and Texas Avenue to the south; Fort Stanton Park to the southeast; and Minnesota Avenue to the west.

Bordering neighborhoods

References

Neighborhoods in Southeast (Washington, D.C.)